Nele Lijnen (born 1978) is a Belgian politician and a member of the Open Vld. She was elected as a member of the Belgian Senate in 2007.

Notes

1978 births
Living people
Open Vlaamse Liberalen en Democraten politicians
Members of the Belgian Federal Parliament
People from Houthalen-Helchteren